The German-Baltic Party (DbPE) was a political party in Estonia representing the German minority.

History
The party was established on 27 November 1918 under the name German Party in Estonia in preparation for the Constituent Assembly elections the following April. Following the Estonian War of Independence, the party was renamed the German-Baltic Party.

The party won three seats in the elections in April 1919. In the parliamentary elections in 1920 it won four seats, but was reduced to three seats in the 1923 elections and two seats in the 1926 elections. For the 1929 elections the party formed the German-Swedish Bloc, winning three seats. This was continued for the 1932 elections, with the bloc again winning three seats.

List of MPs

References

Defunct political parties in Estonia
Political parties of minorities in Estonia
German diaspora political parties